The Korn et Latil was a French automobile manufactured from 1901 until 1902.

The Korn et Latil Company of Marseille formed in 1898 produced a front wheel drive voiturette with a 3½ hp Aster engine. It was designed by Georges Latil, who later became known for his front wheel drive commercial vehicles manufactured as Latils.

See also
 Georges Latil
 Latil - Georges Latil's French truck and tractor manufacturing company

External links 
 french Latil-Website

References
David Burgess Wise, The New Illustrated Encyclopedia of Automobiles
Defunct motor vehicle manufacturers of France
Veteran vehicles